The First Congregational Church is a historic church in Turton, South Dakota.  It was built in 1893 and was added to the National Register of Historic Places in 1979.

It was built by the men of the church, under supervision of carpenter Ferdinand LaBrie, a homesteader in the area.  It provided church services from 1893 until 1963.  The NRHP nomination states: "The importance of this church lies in its importance to the lives of the pioneers who built it and in its being a good representative of the 19th and early 20th century tradition of vernacular frame churches in South Dakota."

References

Congregational churches in South Dakota
19th-century churches in the United States
Churches on the National Register of Historic Places in South Dakota
Churches completed in 1893
Buildings and structures in Spink County, South Dakota
National Register of Historic Places in Spink County, South Dakota